Floodwood may refer to a location in the United States:

 Floodwood, Michigan, a community in Sagola Townsnship, Dickinson County
 Floodwood, Minnesota, a city in St. Louis County
 Floodwood Township, St. Louis County, Minnesota
 Floodwood Mountain Reservation, a Boy Scouts of America site in Saranac Lake, New York
 Floodwood River (Michigan), in Ontonagon County
 Floodwood River (Minnesota)